Vetyolki is a rural locality (a selo) in Sovkhozny Selsoviet, Aleysky District, Altai Krai, Russia. The population was 286 as of 2013. There are 6 streets.

Geography 
Vetyolki is located on the Plotavka River, 38 km SSE of Aleysk (the district's administrative centre) by road. Ust-Porozikha is the nearest rural locality.

References 

Rural localities in Aleysky District